Williams & Pritchard Limited was a small coachbuilding business operating from First Avenue, Edmonton, London N18 which made lightweight sports and racing car bodies as well as runs of cars for small manufacturers fabricated using aluminium or composite construction or moulded fibre-glass.

Start
The business was founded in the late 1940s by Charlie Williams (1915-1969) from Corsica Coachworks and Len Pritchard (1919-2008) whose coachbuilding careers had been diverted by the war to building Spitfire aircraft. They began in Edmonton then worked from Hornsey with an extra workshop in Hammersmith before returning permanently to Edmonton.

Clients
The clients of Williams & Pritchard included: Colin Chapman, Lotus, AC (Aceca coupé), Lola, Cooper, Lister-Jaguar, Elva, John Surtees, Costin, Gordon-Keeble, BRM, John Sprinzel, Speedwell. The last coach building client of William's and Pritchard was designer David Gittens McLaren based Ikenga GT prototypes, constructed between 1967 and completed following Charlie Williams death in June 1969. Another project was carried out for the 1970s when the rare OWEN SEDANCA GT, another original sports car that appeared briefly for sale with Jaguar Straightsix 4235cc running gear from a Jaguar XJ6 car with an aluminium bodyshell of which 80 cars were to be made but only a reputed ten were actually made at their W & S LIMITED Edmonton North London workshops.

In the early days of Lotus, Williams & Pritchard employed about two dozen men and put through production runs that took about three weeks to build a car. Williams & Pritchard was to build every Lotus prototype up to and including the Elan. The close relationship with Lotus ended in 1962 after Lotus set up their own body shop.

Moulds for glass fibre bodies were made from bodies first made and finished in aluminium, but the first Lister-Jaguar was made by shaping a chicken wire armature on the actual chassis.

When the original 1961 Gordon-Keeble project was revived in 1964, a new prototype incorporating improvements over the Bertone version was made in alloy in order to build a mould. Production was planned to be at Eastleigh near Southampton. Williams & Pritchard set up their own facility at Eastleigh employing around 20 extra people there, and another at Edmonton. The partners alternated between the sites. Eventually Keeble's revived project fell apart and it became an expensive experience for Williams and Pritchard.

The most acclaimed British entry in the 1969 Italian International Auto Show in Turino, Italy was the Ikenga MK III GT by Charlie Williams of Williams and Pritchard and David Gittens  ( http://dwij.org/dwij/auto.htm ).

After the sudden death of Charlie Williams in 1969, the fibre-glass section was closed and the business deliberately shrunk to about half a dozen employees building metal prototypes and occasionally restoring famous postwar racing cars. Williams & Pritchard closed in 1986. The rights to the company name have been the subject of various claims in recent years. In 2010, the name 'Williams & Pritchard Ltd' and the design of the ID plate fixed in period to cars bearing W&P coachwork was registered as a UK Trade Mark.

After-market
Williams & Pritchard provided detachable glass fibre hardtops for all contemporary sports cars and replacement front-ends (bonnet and mudguards sections), particularly for Austin-Healey Sprites. They were first launched at the 1961 Racing Car Show.

References

Further reading
 Mike Lawrence, The Coachbuilders Williams & Pritchard, Classic and Sportscar magazine, p.p. 82-88, March 1989. Interview with Len Pritchard.

External links

 1965 Morgan Plus-Four

Coachbuilders of the United Kingdom
Manufacturing companies based in London
Vehicle manufacture in London